The Precious Prize of Gravity is the third studio album by international indie rock band Bellini.

Track listing 

 "Wake Up Under a Truck" – 3:34
 "Numbers" – 3:04
 "Daughter Leaving" – 3:08
 "Susie" – 3:50
 "Tiger's Milk" – 3:03
 "The Man Who Lost His Wings" – 4:26
 "Save The Greyhounds"- 2:41
 "The Thin Line"-4:18
 "The Painter"-2:44
 "A Deep Wound"-3:14

References

Bellini (band) albums
2009 albums